Conrad Robert Murray (born February 19, 1953) is a former Grenadian cardiologist who was the personal doctor of Michael Jackson at the time of his death in 2009. In 2011, Murray was convicted of involuntary manslaughter in Jackson's death for having inadvertently overdosed him with a powerful surgical anesthetic, propofol, which was being improperly used as bedtime sleep agent. Murray served roughly two years out of his original four-year prison sentence.

Early life
Murray was born on February 19, 1953, and was raised by his maternal grandparents, who were farmers in Grenada until he joined his mother, Milta, in Trinidad and Tobago when he was seven years old. He grew up poor in Port of Spain, the capital of Trinidad and Tobago. He did not meet his father, Rawle Andrew, also a physician, until he was 25. Andrew, who died in 2001, was devoted to providing medical services to the poor. Murray finished high school and worked as a volunteer elementary school teacher in Trinidad for a while. After teaching, he worked to save up for college tuition as a customs clerk and insurance underwriter.

Education
In 1973, Murray moved to Houston, Texas, where his father worked, to attend Texas Southern University, and graduated magna cum laude with a degree in pre-med and biological sciences. Murray continued his education at Meharry Medical College, in Nashville, Tennessee, the same school his father attended, and the first medical school in the Southern United States for African Americans. He began his internal medicine residency at the Mayo Clinic in Rochester, Minnesota. Murray completed it at the Loma Linda University Medical Center in California. He then completed a cardiology fellowship at the University of Arizona.

Career
Murray worked at the Sharp Memorial Hospital in San Diego as an associate director of its cardiology fellowship training program. In 1990, he opened a private practice in Las Vegas. In 2006, he founded the Acres Homes Heart and Vascular Institute in Houston. Murray met Michael Jackson in 2006, in Las Vegas, and treated his daughter Paris when she fell ill. Jackson hired Murray to be his exclusive personal physician prior to his tour in July 2009. Jackson insisted that Murray be employed by his show promoter, AEG Live, for $150,000 monthly. However, AEG later claimed that there was never a contract with Murray. Murray and AEG agree that Murray was never paid. In 2018, Murray released a memoir, This Is It!, which detailed his experience as Michael Jackson's physician and tells of having treated Mother Teresa. Murray wrote,

The book was poorly received by critics, with The A.V. Club calling it "literary poison with no antidote" and The Daily Telegraph describing its "thousand words of self-aggrandising, poorly punctuated and repetitive text."

Personal life
In May 2009, Murray began working as Jackson's personal physician. By that time, he had reportedly fathered seven children by six different women. He was in arrears on the mortgage for the Las Vegas home occupied by his first wife and children and owed child support to the mothers of children outside of his marriage, which he could not pay due to the amount of money he owed to Michael Jackson's family. He was married to Blanche, his second wife, whom he met at medical school, and helped pay rent for another woman, Nicole Alvarez. Murray met Alvarez at a gentlemen's club in Las Vegas when she worked as a stripper, and Alvarez gave birth to their son Che Giovanni Murray in March 2009. Another relationship, with a cocktail waitress from Houston, was also reported.

Murray was at risk of losing his California medical license due to unpaid child support to one of his children and owed $13,000 to a California woman, Nenita Malibiran. Murray was a defendant in numerous civil lawsuits (though none for medical malpractice). By 2008, he had accumulated over $600,000 in court judgments against him for medical equipment and unpaid rent for his practices in Texas and Nevada. He also owed $71,000 for student loans at Meharry Medical College. Murray had filed for bankruptcy in 2002, in California.

Michael Jackson's death and trial

On June 25, 2009, only weeks after hiring Murray, Michael Jackson died due to a lethal dose of propofol administered by Murray. Court documents released in August 2009 revealed that the coroner's preliminary conclusion indicated that Jackson overdosed on propofol. However, the coroner's office declined to comment on reports claiming that the death was ruled a homicide. Several offices of doctors who were believed to have treated Jackson were searched. Based on the autopsy and toxicology findings, the cause of Jackson's death was determined to be acute propofol intoxication with a contributory benzodiazepine effect and the manner of death to be a homicide, eventually, so that the focus of the investigation shifted toward Murray. He admitted administering 25 mg of propofol intravenously, for insomnia, on the night of Jackson's death. He claimed that he tried treating him with other drugs and that he only administered the propofol after Jackson insisted, according to a police affidavit. Murray said he worried that Jackson had become dependent on the drug to get to sleep and was trying to wean him from it. Though any FDA-approved drug can be used off-label in a responsible manner that is medically appropriate for their patient, the indicated use for propofol is for anesthesia—not as a sleep aid—and is therefore properly given in a hospital or a clinical setting with close monitoring. Accordingly, propofol is supposed to be administered only by anesthesiologists and emergency-room personnel (intensivists) who received extensive training in the use and monitoring of anesthetics; Murray had no such specialty training.

In February 2011, Murray was formally charged with involuntary manslaughter. On September 27, 2011, Murray went on trial in Los Angeles and was convicted of involuntary manslaughter on November 7, 2011. His bail was revoked and he was remanded to custody pending his November 29 sentencing date. He received the maximum penalty of four years in prison. His Texas medical license was revoked, and his California and Nevada licenses were suspended. After serving two years, Murray was released on parole on October 28, 2013.

Jackson's father, Joe Jackson, filed a wrongful death lawsuit against Murray in 2010 but dropped it in 2012. Also in 2010, Jackson's mother, Katherine Jackson, and three children, filed a separate wrongful death suit against AEG, claiming that the company was negligent in hiring Murray; the jury decided in favor of AEG in 2013.

In 2016, Inside Edition reported that Murray was "still visiting patients," although Murray claimed that he does not charge patients anything for his services, that he is only "providing a consultation" without prescribing medication, and that therefore he "is not breaking the law".

References

1953 births
Living people
21st-century American criminals
American cardiologists
American male criminals
American people convicted of manslaughter
American prisoners and detainees
Grenadian criminals
Grenadian emigrants to the United States
Medical malpractice
Meharry Medical College alumni
People from Saint Andrew Parish, Grenada
Prisoners and detainees of California
Texas Southern University alumni